
Year 768 (DCCLXVIII) was a leap year starting on Friday (link will display the full calendar) of the Julian calendar. The denomination 768 for this year has been used since the early medieval period, when the Anno Domini calendar era became the prevalent method in Europe for naming years.

Events 
 By place 

 Frankish Kingdom 
 September 24 – King Pepin III (the Short) dies at Saint-Denis, Neustria. The Frankish Kingdom is divided between his two sons: Charlemagne and Carloman I. According to Salic law Charlemagne receives the outer parts of the kingdom bordering on the sea, namely Neustria, western Aquitaine, and the northern parts of Austrasia; while Carloman is awarded his uncle's former share, the inner parts: southern Austrasia, Septimania, eastern Aquitaine, Burgundy, Provence, Swabia, and the lands bordering Italy.
 Waiofar, duke of Aquitaine, and his family are captured and executed by the Franks in the forest of Périgord. Waiofar's kinsman Hunald II succeeds to his claims and continues to fight against Charlemagne.

 Iberian Peninsula 
 Fruela I (the Cruel), the King of Asturias, is assassinated in Cangas, his capital, after he murders his brother Vimerano. Fruela is succeeded by his cousin Aurelius, who is chosen by the nobility.
 In al-Andalus, the Berber tribal chieftain Saqiya ibn Abd al Wahid al-Miknasi leads a rebellion against the Emirate of Córdoba, in the present-day Spanish province of Extremadura.

 Britain 
 King Alhred of Northumbria marries Princess Osgifu, possibly daughter of the late king Oswulf (approximate date).

 Asia 
 The Kasuga Shrine is erected at Nara (Japan), by the Fujiwara family. The interior is famous for its many bronze lanterns, as well as the stone lanterns that lead up to the Shinto shrine

 By topic 

 Religion 
 August 7 – Pope Stephen III succeeds Paul I as the 94th pope of the Catholic Church. The antipope Constantine II is overthrown at Rome, through intervention by King Desiderius of the Lombards, after a brief reign (see 767).
 Lebuinus, Anglo-Saxon missionary, founds the city of Deventer (modern-day Netherlands), and builds a wooden church on the bank of the River IJssel (approximate date).
 Archbishop Elfodd of Gwynedd persuades the Welsh Church to accept the Roman dating of Easter, as agreed by the British Church at the Synod of Whitby (see 664).

Births 
 Han Yu, Chinese philosopher and poet (d. 824)
 Konstanti Kakhi, Georgian nobleman (d. 853)
 Song Ruoxin, Chinese scholar, poet and lady-in-waiting (d. 820)
 Xue Tao, Chinese poet (d. 831)

Deaths 
 August 20 – Eadberht, king of Northumbria
 September 24 – Pepin the Short, king of the Franks (b. 714)
 Dub-Indrecht mac Cathail, king of Connacht (Ireland)
 Fruela I, king of Asturias
 Li Huaixian, general of the Tang Dynasty
 Pagan, ruler (khagan) of the Bulgarian Empire 
 Toto, duke of Nepi
 Waiofar, duke of Aquitaine
 Winibald, Anglo-Saxon abbot
 Yaxun B'alam IV, ruler (ajaw) of Yaxchilan (b. 709)

References